Celtis balansae is a species of plant in the family Cannabaceae. It is endemic to New Caledonia.

References

Endemic flora of New Caledonia
balansae
Vulnerable plants
Taxonomy articles created by Polbot
Taxa named by Jules Émile Planchon